Richmondshire is a local government district of North Yorkshire, England. It covers a large northern area of the Yorkshire Dales including Swaledale and Arkengarthdale, Wensleydale and Coverdale, with the prominent Scot's Dyke and Scotch Corner along the centre.  Teesdale lies to the north. With a total area of 1,319 km2, it is larger than seven of the English ceremonial counties (namely, in decreasing order of size, the West Midlands, Merseyside, Tyne & Wear, Rutland, the Isle of Wight, Bristol, and the City of London).

History 

The history of this district in antiquity is not well known, but archeologists have found artifacts from the Neolithic Period (2000–4000 BC), the Bronze Age (2500–2000 BC), the Iron Age (700 BC–first century AD) and the Roman Period (43–400 AD) in the Richmond area.

The closest important Roman settlement was at Catterick in what became known as Rheged, site of the Battle of Catterick. 

At the terminus of Scandinavian York, there was a local bout of rebellion in Stainmore, which resulted in the death of Eric Bloodaxe. The Scandinavian settlement of this area was eastwards from the Irish Sea with names such as Gilpatrick in Middleham and Thorfinn in Bedale occurring at the time of the Domesday Book.  At the time of the Norman Conquest it was the Fee of Gillingshire, held by Edwin, Earl of Mercia. Gillingshire
was made up of the Borough of Richmond and five wapentakes of Gilling West, Gilling East, Hang West, Hang East and Hallikeld. 

After the Harrying of the North, the land became capital of the Duchy of Brittany's Honour of Richmond (first as a barony, then an earldom and later a dukedom).

The Honour of Richmond was one of the three largest lordships created by William the Conqueror. King William granted it to his double-second-cousin, Alan the Red, the leader of the Bretons in England and a cousin of Hawise, Duchess of Brittany.

According to the Register of the Honour of Richmond, the official transfer of the lands of Earl Edwin (Richmondshire) occurred at the "Siege of York" in 1068 or early 1069. Edwin's brother Morcar, Earl of Northumbria, lost his title to Robert Commines on 28 January 1069 and also lost lands to Count Alan following the brothers' participation in the northern rebellion of 1068. 

A charter of Count Alan Rufus's dated before 1086 states that he obtained the honour with the help of Queen Matilda.  Alan had many other English estates, and by the time of the compilation of the Domesday Book he was one of the richest and most powerful barons. He died in 1093 and was succeeded by two of his brothers in turn. The family held on to this estate until 1399. Work on Richmond Castle started in 1071 after the northern rebellions had died down.

The Honour of Richmond comprised 782 manors throughout England. The Yorkshire portion was a compact unit of 199 manors and 43 outlying properties situated near the main roads from Scotland into the Vale of York.

Richmondshire became an appanage of the English Royal Family during the reign of Edward III of England. In 1525 Henry FitzRoy, 1st Duke of Richmond and Somerset (1519–1536) became Lord Warden of the Marches and Lord President of the Council of the North while living at Sheriff Hutton.

One of the most distinctive forenames of Richmondshire folk was Marmaduke.

Ecclesiastical divisions 

St. Paulinus baptised the locals in the River Swale and as a result, it was known as the "Jordan of England". 

Richmondshire is an archdeaconry which historically consisted of present-day Richmondshire and the Barony of Kendal in Westmorland, Copeland in Cumberland and what is now Lancashire north of Ribblesdale, such as Amounderness and Lonsdale. 

After originally composing part of the Diocese of York, it was transferred to the Diocese of Chester, before moving into the Diocese of Ripon and Leeds and finally the Diocese of Leeds (known informally as the 'Diocese of West Yorkshire and the Dales' for a period, although this term has now fallen out of use).

Modern history 

The current district was formed on 1 April 1974, under the Local Government Act 1972. It was a merger of the municipal borough of Richmond with the Aysgarth Rural District, Leyburn Rural District, Reeth Rural District and Richmond Rural District along with part of the Croft Rural District, all in the North Riding of Yorkshire.

See Richmondshire District Council for details of the political makeup.

In July 2021 the Ministry of Housing, Communities and Local Government announced that in April 2023, the non-metropolitan county will be reorganised into a unitary authority.  Richmondshire District Council will be abolished and its functions transferred to a new single authority for the non-metropolitan county of North Yorkshire.

Economy 
The region is heavily agricultural but there are also many commercial enterprises, supported by four main business associations: Richmond Business and Tourism Association, Swaledale and Arkengarthdale Business Association,
Lower Wensleydale Business Network and Upper Wensleydale Business Association.

Tourism is an important part of the economy with some visitors attracted by the Yorkshire Dales. In 2014, roughly 3.62 million people visited the area; tourism provided some £225 million to the economy and supported 3,860 full time jobs. There are many hiking trails in the region as well as various attractions. Travellers using the Trip Advisor site particularly recommend Richmond Castle, Green Howards Museum, Georgian Theatre Royal, The Station, Millgate House Garden, Richmondshire Museum, Foxglove Covert Local Nature Reserve, Catterick Racecourse, The Friary Gardens War Memorial and Friary Tower and Gardens.

Important communities for visitors include Hawes in Wensleydale, the home of Wensleydale cheese, Leyburn, a market town with many amenities, the very quaint villages of Reeth, Wensley, West Burton and Muker, and Middleham with its castle and horse racing.

Catterick Garrison is also important to the economy, particularly around Richmond. It is the largest British Army garrison in the world with a population of around 13,000 and expected to continue growing.

Settlements 

The modern administrative area of Richmondshire includes the major settlements of:
 Askrigg
 Barton
 Brough with St. Giles
 Catterick
 Catterick Garrison
 Colburn
 Croft-on-Tees
 Hawes
 Keld
 Leyburn
 Middleham
 Middleton Tyas
 Reeth
 Richmond

See also 
 Hallamshire
 Hexhamshire
 History of Yorkshire
 List of hundreds of England and Wales
 Winchcombeshire

References

Bibliography 
 The Pilgrimage of Grace: The rebellion that shook Henry VIII's throne by Geoffrey Moorhouse
 The Wars of the Roses by John Gillingham
 The Pilgrimage of Grace: and the politics of the 1530s by R. W. Hoyle.
 The Penguin Illustrated History of Britain and Ireland: from earliest times to the present day by Barry Cunliffe, Robert Bartlett (historian), John Morrill (historian), Asa Briggs and Joanna Burke
 The Swale: A history of the Holy River of St Paulinus by David Morris
 The Honour of Richmond: a history of the lords, earls and dukes of Richmond by David Morris
 Conquest, Anarchy & Lordship: Yorkshire, 1066–1154 by Paul Dalton
 Albion's Seed: Four British Folkways in America by David Hackett Fischer
 Yorkshire Dales by Ron Scholes
 'Richmondshire: Introduction', A History of the County of York North Riding: Volume 1 by William Page
 Richmond: Geographical and Historical information from the year 1890 from Bulmer's History and Directory of North Yorkshire (1890)
 The Early History of Bedale by H. B. McCall
 BY ANY NAME, JUNE BRINGS SUMMER by The Northern Echo
 A Dictionary of First Names, Oxford University Press 

 
Districts of England established in 1974
Non-metropolitan districts of North Yorkshire
Former counties of England